The colloquialism control freak usually describes a person with an obsession with getting things done a certain way. A control freak can become distressed when someone causes a deviation in the way they prefer to do things.

Control freak can also describe a person who tries to make others do things the way that they want, even if the other people prefer to do it another way, and even if the initial person has no good reason for interfering.

This expression first appeared around the 1960s.

Characteristics
Control freaks tend to have a psychological need to be in charge of things and people - even circumstances that cannot be controlled. The need for control, in extreme cases, stem from deeper psychological issues such as obsessive–compulsive disorder (OCD), anxiety disorders or personality disorders.

Control freaks are often perfectionists. They may manipulate or pressure others to change so as to avoid having to change themselves. 

Control freaks sometimes have similarities to codependents, in the sense that the latters' fear of abandonment leads to attempts to control those they are dependent on.

Examples

 Steve Jobs  Steve Jobs was a perfectionist who favored the closed system of control over all aspects of a product from start to finish — what he termed the integrated over the fragmented approach. As Steve Wozniak, his long-term collaborator and occasional critic, put it: "Apple gets you into their playpen and keeps you there".
 Queen Victoria  A series of three documentary programs on BBC2 in the UK in January 2013 called Queen Victoria's Children argued that Queen Victoria was a pathological control freak by the way she controlled the welfare of all her children.

See also

References

Slang
English phrases
Pejorative terms for people
Power (social and political)
Control (social and political)